Hewat may refer to:

Surname:
Alexander Hewat (1739–1824), the first historian of South Carolina and Georgia
Andrew Fergus Hewat FRSE (1884–1957), Scottish physician involved with mental health
Brian Hewat (1894–1970), New Zealand politician
Corrina Hewat (born 1970), Scottish harpist and composer, Music Tutor of the Year at Na Trads in 2013
David Hewat (1866–1959), New Zealand cricketer
Elizabeth G. K. Hewat (1895–1968), PhD (University of Edinburgh), missionary, campaigner for women's equality, historian of Scottish missions
Peter Hewat (born 1978), Australian rugby union player now playing in Japan's Top League for Suntory Sungoliath
Reece Hewat (born 1995), South African-born Australian rugby union player
Richard Alexander Hewat (1896–1918), American pursuit pilot who flew with the Royal Flying Corps (RFC) in World War I
Robert Hewat (1863–1953), New Zealand cricketer
Ron Hewat, Canadian former sportscaster and broadcast executive
Tim Hewat (1928–2004), Australian television producer and journalist
William Hewat, Irish politician and company director

Given name:
James Hewat McKenzie (1869–1929), British parapsychologist, founder of the British College of Psychic Science
William Hewat McLeod (1932–2009), New Zealand scholar who helped establish Sikhism studies as a distinctive field outside India

See also
Hewitt (name)
Hewit, surname